The Tall is an epithet which may refer to:

People:
Albert I, Duke of Brunswick-Lüneburg and Prince of Wolfenbüttel (1236–1279)
Bolesław I the Tall (1127–1201), Duke of Wroclaw
Canute II of Sweden (died 1234), King of Sweden
Philip V of France (1292–1322), King of France
Stefan Lazarević, Serbian Despot (1402–27)
Thorkell the Tall, a Viking in the tenth and early eleventh centuries

Fictional characters:
Elendil the Tall, in J.R.R. Tolkien's fantasy universe
Duncan the Tall, in George R. R. Martin's fantasy universe A Song of Ice & Fire

See also
List of people known as the Short

Lists of people by epithet